Carlisle Municipal Airport  is a city-owned, public-use airport located two nautical miles (4 km) northeast of the central business district of Carlisle, a city in Lonoke County, Arkansas, United States. It is included in the National Plan of Integrated Airport Systems for 2011–2015, which categorized it as a general aviation facility.

Facilities and aircraft 
Carlisle Municipal Airport covers an area of 640 acres (259 ha) at an elevation of 241 feet (73 m) above mean sea level. It has two runways with asphalt surfaces: 9/27 is 4,501 by 75 feet (1,372 x 23 m) and 18/36 is 4,494 by 60 feet (1,370 x 18 m).

For the 12-month period ending March 31, 2011, the airport had 48,100 aircraft operations, an average of 131 per day: 99.8% general aviation and 0.2% military. At that time there were 14 aircraft based at this airport: 93% single-engine and 7% multi-engine.

History
The airport was built by the United States Army Air Forces during 1942/43 as an axillary airfield for Stuttgart Army Airfield, near Stuttgart, Arkansas.  It was known simply as Stuttgart Army Airfield Auxiliary #1.  The runways in use today were built during that period.   It was used to help train medium bomber and transport pilots, who used it for emergencies on it or practiced touch-and-go landings.   It was not staffed, and at the end of World War II it was simply abandoned and the land turned over to local authorities, like many other small auxiliary airfields. 

The City of Carlisle developed the current airport from the former military airfield.

References

External links 
 Airport page at City of Carlisle website
 Carlisle Municipal (4M3) at Arkansas Department of Aeronautics
 Aerial image as of March 1990 from USGS The National Map
 
 
 

Airports in Arkansas
Transportation in Lonoke County, Arkansas
Buildings and structures in Lonoke County, Arkansas